K.T. Mohammed Musliyar, who was known as K.T. Manu Musliyar was an Islamic scholar, orator, and writer and General Secretary of Samastha Kerala Islam Matha Vidyabhyasa Board, which is one of the biggest educational organisation in Kerala. He also was a great leader of Samastha Kerala Jamiyyathul Ulama.

Career
Musliyar became a member of the Central Mushawara of Samastha Kerala Jam-iyyathul Ulema in 1974. He quickly rose to become an office secretary, and finally a joint secretary for the organization.

Death
He died of a heart attack on 1 February 2009 at Calicut during the golden jubilee celebrations of Samastha Kerala Jam'iyyathul Mu'allimeen were being held. He was aged 75 at the time of his death. He was buried the next day at the qabarstan of Darunnajath Islamic Centre Juma Masjid at Karuvarakundu, his hometown.

Notes

External links
Samastha Kerala Islamic Educational Board

People from Malappuram district
20th-century Muslim scholars of Islam
Islam in Kerala
1934 births
2009 deaths
Kerala Sunni-Shafi'i scholars